The following are the national records in athletics in Aruba maintained by its national athletics federation: Arubaanse Atletiek Bond (AAB).

Outdoor

Key to tables:

h = hand timing

# = not ratified by federation or/and IAAF

Mx = mixed race

Men

Women

Men Junior

Women Junior

Indoor

Men

Women

Women Junior

Notes

References

External links
AAB web site
Aruban Athletic Records - Outdoor

Aruba
Athletics
Records
Athletics